Annes Varjun (18 August 1907 – 6 June 1986) was an Estonian artist who worked in ceramics. His works are on display in the Estonian Museum of Applied Art and Design and in the Tallinn Art Hall.

References

External links 
 Example of his work from the Tallinn Art Hall

1907 births
1986 deaths
20th-century Estonian male artists
Estonian Academy of Arts alumni